Rescue at Midnight Castle, also known as My Little Pony, Escape from Midnight Castle, or Rescue from Midnight Castle, and released later as Firefly's Adventure, My Little Pony in Dreamland and My Little Pony: Rescue at Midnight Castle is a 1984 animated television special based on the Hasbro toy line, My Little Pony. It was released as a pilot of the proposed television series, and featured the voices of Sandy Duncan and Tony Randall. A second special was produced in 1985, Escape from Catrina.

Plot 
The story begins as the peaceful ponies of Dream Valley are attacked by monsters, led by Scorpan, who kidnap four ponies and take them away to Midnight Castle. Enraged, Firefly, a Pegasus pony, takes to the skies to try to find someone who can help them defeat Tirac, a centaur-like demon whose plan is to use these ponies to pull his Chariot of Darkness. On her way, she crashes into 12-year-old Megan's well and asks her for her help. Megan is at first reluctant to go but after being confronted by the monsters, she sets out with the ponies to rescue them.

At Midnight Castle, Tirac has the smallest pony, Ember, taken to the dungeons, and uses the Rainbow of Darkness to turn the other three ponies Scorpan captured into dragons. He tells Scorpan to bring him a fourth pony by midnight, threatening to behead his friend, Spike, the baby dragon.

Megan, Firefly, and the ponies Applejack, Twilight, and Bow Tie go to see the Moochick, who has magic powers and might know how to defeat Tirac. On the way, Applejack falls off a bridge into the river and Megan jumps after her, from which they are rescued by the Sea Ponies, who tell them to call on them if they need help again. Megan and the ponies find the Moochick, who says that to defeat Tirac they must take away his Rainbow of Darkness, which gives him his power. He also gives them the Rainbow of Light, which can help defeat Tirac.

Arriving at Midnight Castle, Megan and the ponies cross the moat of raging water with help from the Sea Ponies. Meanwhile, Scorpan fails to get a fourth pony for Tirac, who threatens Spike again. Scorpan releases Spike and Ember from the dungeons. Applejack is captured by Tirac, who turns her into a dragon. Scorpan enters, attacks Tirac's guards, and runs outside with Megan and the ponies. With four corrupted ponies, Tirac rides his Chariot of Darkness. Tirac defeats Scorpan, nearly killing him, while Megan rides Firefly and knocks the Rainbow of Darkness out of Tirac's hand. The ponies fight Tirac's guards over the Rainbow of Darkness, but in the end, Tirac gets it back. Megan unleashes the Rainbow of Light, which is actually very small and does nothing at first. Tirac uses the Rainbow of Darkness on the Rainbow of Light, which fights back, overpowers the Rainbow of Darkness, and destroys Tirac. Everything Tirac transformed with the Rainbow of Darkness is restored to its original state, including the ponies and Scorpan, whose original form is a human prince. Spike, however, has always been a dragon.

As the credits roll, Firefly carries Megan back home where she hugs her own horse, T.J.

Voice cast 
 Sandy Duncan as Firefly, Medley and Applejack
 Tony Randall as The Moochick
 Charlie Adler as Spike
 Tammy Amerson as Megan
 Fran Brill
 Victor Caroli as Tirac
 Laura Dean as Twilight, Bow Tie and Cotton Candy
 Carol Goodheart
 Lani Groves as Wavedancer
 Yolanda Brica Lee Lewis
 Lynne Lipton as Ember
 Ullanda McCullough as Seawinkle
 Gerrianne Raphael as Sealight
 Ron Taylor as Scorpan/The Prince

Musical numbers 
 "My Little Pony Opening Chorus"
 "Dancing On Air" - Firefly and Megan
 "Call Upon the Sea Ponies" - Sea Ponies
 "Little Piece of Rainbow" - Moochick
 "My Little Pony Closing Chorus"

Impact

My Little Pony 'n Friends airing 
The special was edited into a two part episode of My Little Pony 'n Friends television series and re-titled "Escape from Midnight Castle". The opening animated sequence with narrated voice-actor credits, as well as its end credits, were removed and replaced with the standard 1986 TV series opening/closing. Also omitted is the two and a half-minute animated musical number "Little Piece of Rainbow", sung by Tony Randall. The episode aired at the end of the TV show's first season, in November 1986. A similar edit was done to the follow up 1985 TV special, Escape from Catrina, which aired at the end of the second season as "Escape from Katrina".

Inspiration for Friendship Is Magic 
Lauren Faust got much inspiration for My Little Pony: Friendship Is Magic from this special, and the 1986 television series. She gave similar personalities to the new generation of ponies from the older series and specials, making them live on for a new generation. Tirac, renamed as Tirek, also appears in the series as a major antagonist, introduced in the two-part season 4 finale "Twilight's Kingdom" with a cameo appearance by Scorpan in the flashback sequence.

References

External links 

 

1984 animated films
1984 films
1984 television specials
My Little Pony serials
American television series premieres
Sunbow Entertainment films
Television specials by Marvel Productions
Pegasus in popular culture
Films scored by Johnny Douglas
American television films
1980s animated television specials
1980s English-language films
1980s American films